Velké Heraltice is a municipality and village in Opava District in the Moravian-Silesian Region of the Czech Republic. It has about 1,600 inhabitants.

Administrative parts
Villages of Košetice, Malé Heraltice, Sádek and Tábor are administrative parts of Velké Heraltice.

Geography
It is located in the Nízký Jeseník mountain range.

History
The first written mention of Velké Heraltice is from 1265.

References

External links

Villages in Opava District